A lone wolf is a wolf not belonging to a pack.

Lone wolf or Lone Wolf may also refer to:

Literature
Lone Wolf, a book by Kathryn Lasky, part of the series called Wolves of the Beyond
Lone Wolf and Cub, a 1970 Japanese graphic novel
Lone Wolf, a book by Maryanne Vollers about bomber Eric Robert Rudolph
Lone Wolf (Jabotinsky biography), a 1996 biography of Ze'ev 'Vladimir' Jabotinsky
Lone Wolf (gamebooks), a series of gamebooks created by Joe Dever
Lone Wolf (Picoult novel), 2012
Lone Wolf (Muchamore novel), 2014
Lone Wolf (character) or Michael Lanyard, a character in a series of detective books by Louis Joseph Vance

Music 
 Lone Wolf (Hank Williams Jr. album), 1990
 Lone Wolf (Michael Martin Murphey album), 1978
 "Lone Wolf", a song by Eels from Shootenanny!
 "Lone Wolf", a song by Eric Church from Heart & Soul
 "Lone Wolf", a song by Corey Hart from Young Man Running
 "Lone Wolf", the theme tune for videogame character Guile
 "Lone Wolf", a song by Judas Priest from Firepower
 Lone Wolf Management, a record label run by Karl Wolf
 "Lonewolf", a song by Running Wild from Blazon Stone

People
Lone Wolf [the Elder] (1820–1879), Guipago, last Principal Chief of the Kiowa tribe
Lone Wolf the Younger (c. 1843–1923), Kiowa leader
Lone Wolf, the Blackfoot name of artist Hart Merriam Schultz
Ted Lone Wolf (fl. 1922–1923), American football player
The Lone Wolf, Scott Hall, American professional wrestler
Lone Wolf, the field name of fictional character John Rambo
Lone Wolf, nickname of Baron Corbin, American professional wrestler

Film, media, and games
 Lone Wolf, a masked character in the video game, Resident Evil: Operation Raccoon City
 Lone Wolf (1978 film), a Soviet film
 Lone Wolf (2021 film), an Australian science fiction drama thriller film
Lone Wolf McQuade, a 1983 film starring Chuck Norris
 The Lone Wolf, a 1917 American silent film based on the 1914 novel of the same name by Louis Joseph Vance
 Joe Dever's Lone Wolf, 2013 video game

Other uses
 Lone Wolf, Oklahoma
 Lone wolf attack, a mass murder planned and committed by a single person

See also
Lone Wolf v. Hitchcock, a United States Supreme Court case
The Lone Wolf (disambiguation)